Sisters-in-Law is a 2017 South Korean television series starring Hahm Eun-jung, Lee Joo-yeon, Kang Kyung-joon, and Cha Do-jin. The series airs daily on MBC from 20:55 to 21:30 (KST), however, starting episode 40, the series was moved to Monday and Tuesday 20:55 (KST) time-slot with 2 episodes back-to-back.

Cast

Main 
 Hahm Eun-jung as Hwang Eun-byul
 Kang Kyung-joon as Choi Han-joo
 Lee Joo-yeon as Hwang Geum-byul
 Cha Do-jin as Park Min-ho

Supporting 
 Nam Myung-ryul as Hwang Ho-sik
 Kim Chung as Na Myung-ja
 Kim Young-ok as Kang Hae-soon
 Jo Kyung-sook as Shin Young-ae
 Kim Byung-choon as Choi Soo-chan
 Park Hee-jin as Choi Soon-young
 Cha Seo-won as Choi Dong-joo
 Choi Jung-woo as Park Sang-goo
 Moon Hee-kyung as Yoon So-hee
 Nam Sang-ji as Park Ji-ho
 Jang Sung-won as Jang Tae-poong
 Oh Joo-eun as Oh Mi-ja
 Son Se-yoon as Yang Soo-min
 Kim Jae-hyun as Kim Tae-gi
 Son Gun-woo as Yoon Gun-woo
 Song Ho-soo as Oh Seung-chan
 Yang Dae-hyuk as Jang Hyun-soo
 Jung Ah-rang as Kim Mi-jung
 Choi Hyun-seo as Baek Min-joo
 Ahn Bo-hyun as James Seo / Seo Joon-young
 Kim Young-pil as Han Jang-soo
 Kim Jung-soo as Doctor Kim
 Choi Seung-hoon

Original soundtrack

Part 1

Part 2

Part 3

Ratings 
In this table,  represent the lowest ratings and  represent the highest ratings.
NR denotes that the drama did not rank in the top 20 daily programs on that date.

Awards and nominations

References

External links
  

2017 South Korean television series debuts
Korean-language television shows
2017 South Korean television series endings
Television series by IWill Media